Kutiškiai (formerly) is a village in Kėdainiai district municipality, in Kaunas County, in central Lithuania. According to the 2011 census, the village had a population of 21 people. There is old cemetery by the regional road  Kėdainiai-Krekenava-Panevėžys.

Demography

Images

References

Villages in Kaunas County
Kėdainiai District Municipality